Sunday Punch may refer to:
Sunday Punch (film)
Sunday punch, a knockout blow in boxing